Slottsskogen/Godhem IF, abbreviated SG97, is a Swedish football club located in Göteborg.  The  club was founded in 1997.

Background
Since their foundation Slottsskogen/Godhem IF has participated mainly in the middle divisions of the Swedish football league system.  The club currently plays in Division 4 Göteborg which is the sixth tier of Swedish football. They play their home matches at the Ruddalen in Göteborg.

Slottsskogen/Godhem IF are affiliated to the Göteborgs Fotbollförbund.

Season to season

Attendances

In recent seasons Slottsskogen/Godhem IF have had the following average attendances:

Footnotes

External links
 Slottsskogen/Godhem IF – Official website

Football clubs in Gothenburg
Association football clubs established in 1997
1997 establishments in Sweden
Football clubs in Västra Götaland County